McGraw Run is a  long 2nd order tributary to Little Wheeling Creek in Ohio County, West Virginia.

Course 
McGraw Run rises in a pond about 4 miles south of West Liberty, West Virginia, in Ohio County and then flows south to join Little Wheeling Creek at Valley Grove.

Watershed 
McGraw Run drains  of area, receives about 40.9 in/year of precipitation, has a wetness index of 292.72, and is about 64% forested.

See also 
 List of rivers of West Virginia

References 

Rivers of Ohio County, West Virginia
Rivers of West Virginia